Werner Hoyer (born 17 November 1951) is a German economist and politician of the Free Democratic Party (FDP) who is currently serving as the President of the European Investment Bank.

Education and early career

Hoyer graduated as an economist at the University of Cologne in 1974, and worked as a scientific assistant there until 1984. He earned from the same university a PhD degree in economics (i.e. German doctorate Dr. rer. pol.) in 1977, with a dissertation called Vermögenseffekte des Geldes – Theoretische Ansätze zur Rolle des Geldes als Vermögensobjekt im Wirtschaftsprozess (Wealth Effects of Money – Theoretical Approaches to the Role of Money as a Capital Property in the Economic Process).  From 1985 to 1987, he worked with the Carl Duisberg Society in Cologne. He taught international economics at the University of Cologne until 1994. Hoyer is a member of the Union of European Federalists (UEF).

Political career
In 1972, Hoyer became a member of the FDP, and was a board member of the Young Liberals from 1983 to 1986. He chaired the local party board in Cologne from 1984 to 1992, and became a member of the FDP board in North Rhine-Westphalia in 1984 and the federal FDP board in 1994. Under the leadership of Klaus Kinkel, he was Secretary General of his party from 1993 to 1994. From 1997 to 2000, he was Vice President and from 2000 to 2005, President, of the European Liberal Democrat and Reform Party.

Member of the German Bundestag, 1987–2012
Hoyer first became a member of the Bundestag in the 1987 elections, and served as chief whip from 1989 to 1993 and his party's spokesman for security policy from 1990 to 1994. From 2002 to 2009, he was deputy chair of the FDP parliamentary group in the Bundestag under the leadership of successive chairmen Wolfgang Gerhardt (2002-2006) and Guido Westerwelle (2006-2009). Between 2005 and 2009, he also served as Deputy Chairman of the German-American Parliamentary Friendship Group.

Minister of State at the Federal Foreign Office, 1994–98

From 1994 to 1998, Hoyer was Minister of State at the Foreign Office in the Fifth Kohl Cabinet under Foreign Minister Klaus Kinkel. In this capacity, he was the German representative in a high-level working group chaired by Spanish foreign minister Carlos Westendorp and set up to prepare the negotiations on treaty change which led to the Treaties of Amsterdam and subsequently, Nice. In 1996, he was the German negotiator during an intergovernmental conference in Turin that was aimed at improvements in the European Union's decision-making processes, including the establishment of a High Representative of the Union for Foreign Affairs and Security Policy. He also repeatedly reiterated German determination to enter a single currency – the Euro – by 1999.

Minister of State at the Federal Foreign Office, 2009–12

From October 28, 2009 Hoyer was Minister of State at the Foreign Office in the Second Cabinet Merkel under Foreign Minister Guido Westerwelle. During that time, he was Germany’s official in charge of German-French relations. He resigned in 2012.

In August 2011, Hoyer issued a tough statement criticizing plans by Denmark to build new control posts between the two countries, insisting that this unilateral decision to increase customs procedures on the border violated European law.

President of the European Investment Bank, 2012–present

On the basis of a nomination by the German government, Hoyer was appointed as President and Member of the Management Committee of the European Investment Bank in 2012, succeeding Philippe Maystadt. His competitors for the post included Magdalena Álvarez, at the time one of the EIB's eight vice-presidents. In 2017, Hoyer was re-appointed for a second six-year term.

In 2012, Hoyer called for a new Marshall Plan – a reference to the US-financed programme that revived European economies after World War II – to be launched to reanimate the Greek economy, involving both private and public investment. He said the EIB had the resources to invest in Greek infrastructure and support Greek banks to revive lending to businesses.

Following his party’s strong performance in the 2017 German elections, Hoyer was cited as a possible candidate to succeed Wolfgang Schäuble and take over as Federal Minister of Finance.

Other activities
 Berlin office of the American Jewish Committee (AJC), Member of the Advisory Board
 Charlemagne Prize Foundation, Member of the Board
 European Leadership Network (ELN), Member
 European Movement International, Member of the Honorary Council
 Friedrich August von Hayek Foundation, Member of the Board of Trustees
 German-Algerian Society, President
 German Council on Foreign Relations (DGAP), Member of the Steering Committee
 Institute for European Politics, President of the Board of Trustees
 Ludwig Erhard Foundation, Member

Personal life
Hoyer is married and has two children.

References

External links 

 Werner Hoyer
 Bundestag biography
 

1951 births
Living people
Members of the Bundestag for North Rhine-Westphalia
Presidents of the European Investment Bank
German officials of the European Union
Members of the Bundestag 2009–2013
Members of the Bundestag 2005–2009
Members of the Bundestag 2002–2005
Members of the Bundestag 1998–2002
Members of the Bundestag 1994–1998
Members of the Bundestag for the Free Democratic Party (Germany)